Michael Passell (born 1947) is a professional American bridge player from Dallas, Texas.

Passell was inducted into the ACBL Hall of Fame in 2008.

Bridge accomplishments

Honors

 ACBL Hall of Fame, 2008

Awards

 Fishbein Trophy (2) 1978, 2016
 Mott-Smith Trophy (2) 1978, 1983

Wins

 Bermuda Bowl (1) 1979 
 d'Orsi Senior Bowl (1) 2013 
 World Transnational Open Teams Championship (1) 2001 
 North American Bridge Championships (27)
 Lebhar IMP Pairs (1) 1988 
 Silodor Open Pairs (3) 1978, 1983, 1999 
 Grand National Teams (1) 1981 
 Jacoby Open Swiss Teams (2) 1991, 1996 
 Roth Open Swiss Teams (2) 2013, 2016
 Vanderbilt (2) 1978, 1982 
 Senior Knockout Teams (2) 2009, 2017
 Keohane North American Swiss Teams (3) 2008, 2009  ,2014
 Mitchell Board-a-Match Teams (3) 1986, 1988, 1993 
 Reisinger (4) 1976, 1988, 1992, 2003 
 Spingold (3) 1978, 1986, 1989 
 Von Zedtwitz Life Master Pairs (1) 2016

Runners-up

 Bermuda Bowl (1) 1977 
 North American Bridge Championships
 von Zedtwitz Life Master Pairs (1) 1976 
 Rockwell Mixed Pairs (1) 1982 
 Wernher Open Pairs (1) 1983 
 Grand National Teams (2) 1998, 2004 
 Jacoby Open Swiss Teams (1) 2003 
 Roth Open Swiss Teams (2) 2012, 2017
 Vanderbilt (3) 1976, 1997, 1998 
 Senior Knockout Teams (3) 2013, 2014, 2015
 Keohane North American Swiss Teams (1) 2006 
 Mitchell Board-a-Match Teams (1) 1995 
 Chicago Mixed Board-a-Match (1) 1996 
 Reisinger (5) 1980, 1990, 1993, 1994, 1996 
 Spingold (2) 1994, 1997

2015 Palmetto Regional incident 
In November 2015, the ACBL Appeals and Charges committee upheld a finding by the Ethical Oversight Committee that, during the 2015 Palmetto Regional, Passell had violated sections 3.1, 3.7, and 3.20 of the ACBL's Code of Disciplinary Regulations.  According to a joint statement by the ACBL and Passell, Passell admitted to fouling a board at the 2015 Palmetto Regional and failing to call the tournament director.  Passell was suspended for 14 days starting December 20, 2015, and forfeited the 15.40 masterpoints earned at the event.

References

External links
  – with video interview
 
 ACBL Winners Search - Mike Passell 

1947 births
American contract bridge players
Bermuda Bowl players
People from Dallas
Living people
Place of birth missing (living people)
Date of birth missing (living people)